Pantoliano is an Italian surname. Notable people with the surname include:

 Joe Pantoliano (born 1951), American character actor
 Michelle Pantoliano (born 1974), American journalist

Italian-language surnames